Lucapina is a genus of sea snails, marine gastropod mollusks in the family Fissurellidae, the keyhole limpets.

Species
Species within the genus Lucapina include:

 Lucapina adspersa (Philippi, 1845)
 Lucapina aegis (Reeve, 1850)
 Lucapina elisae Costa & Simone, 2006
 Lucapina eolis Pérez Farfante, 1945
 Lucapina philippiana (Finlay, 1930)
 Lucapina sowerbii (Sowerby, 1835)
 Lucapina suffusa (Reeve, 1850)
Species brought into synonymy
 Lucapina adspersa auct. non Philippi, 1845: synonym of Lucapina sowerbii (Sowerby, 1835) 
 Lucapina cayenensis Lamarck, 1822: synonym of Diodora cayenensis (Lamarck, 1822) 
 Lucapina elegans Sowerby, 1835: synonym of Lucapina sowerbii (Sowerby, 1835) 
 Lucapina fasciata Dall, 1884: synonym of Lucapina sowerbii (Sowerby, 1835) 
 Lucapina harrassowitzi Ihering, 1927: synonym of Diodora harrassowitzi  (Ihering, 1927) 
 Lucapina itapema Ihering, 1927: synonym of Fissurella rosea (Gmelin, 1791)
 Lucapina limatula Reeve, 1850: synonym of Lucapinella limatula (Reeve, 1850)
 Lucapina meta Ihering, 1927: synonym of Diodora meta (Ihering, 1927)
 Lucapina monilifera Hutton, 1873: synonym of Monodilepas monilifera (Hutton, 1873)
 Lucapina textaranea Olsson & Harbison, 1953 : synonym of Lucapina suffusa (Reeve, 1850) 
 Lucapina tobagoensis Pérez Farfante, 1945: synonym of Lucapina suffusa (Reeve, 1850)

References

 Vaught, K.C. (1989). A classification of the living Mollusca. American Malacologists: Melbourne, FL (USA). . XII, 195 pp. 
 Rolán E., 2005. Malacological Fauna From The Cape Verde Archipelago. Part 1, Polyplacophora and Gastropoda.

Fissurellidae